was a Japanese actor. He appeared in more than 130 films between 1938 and 1995.

Selected filmography

 Wolf (1955)
 The Burmese Harp (1956)
 The Hole (1957)
 The Temptress and the Monk (1958)
 Enjō (1958)
 Odd Obsession (1959)
 Her Brother (1960)
 Being Two Isn't Easy (1962)
 Bad Girl (1963)
 Taikōki (1965, TV), Hirate Masahide
 Profound Desires of the Gods (1968)
 Double Suicide (1969)
 The Return of Ultraman (1971, TV)
 Daichūshingura (1971, TV)
 Horror Theater Unbalance (1973, TV)
 Ultraman Taro (1973–74, TV)
 Prophecies of Nostradamus (1974)
 Himiko (1974)
 Ballad of Orin (1977)
 Kusa Moeru (1979, TV)
 Kofuku (1981)
 Samurai Reincarnation (1981)
 The Burmese Harp (1985)
 Gonza the Spearman (1986)
 Aitsu ni Koishite (1987)
 Takeda Shingen (1988, TV)
 Sleeping Man (1996)

References

External links

1906 births
1995 deaths
Japanese male film actors
People from Fukuoka
20th-century Japanese male actors